Herrera v. Wyoming, No. 17-532, 587 U.S. ___ (2019), was a United States Supreme Court case in which the Court held that Wyoming's statehood did not void the Crow Tribe's right to hunt on "unoccupied lands of the United States" under an 1868 treaty, and that the Bighorn National Forest did not automatically become "occupied" when the forest was created.

Background 
In January 2014 Clayvin Herrera, a member of the Crow Tribe of Indians, along with several other members of his tribe, followed a group of Rocky Mountain elk from the Crow reservation in Montana into Bighorn National Forest in Wyoming. There, they shot three elk, taking them home for food. Wyoming officials cited Herrera and his companions for hunting out of season, a violation of state law.

Herrera's two companions both pleaded guilty to the poaching charges and paid the fines that Wyoming imposed.
Herrera, however, argued that their hunt was lawful, citing the Treaty of Fort Laramie, which allowed them to hunt on "unoccupied lands".

Wyoming disagreed, arguing that Herrera's claim had been invalidated by the Supreme Court 120 years prior, in Ward v. Race Horse. There, the Court held that Wyoming's admission into the Union had superseded the rights of Indians to hunt there, because it had joined the Union "on the same footing" as the other states, giving it control over the natural resources within its border.

Case 
The Supreme Court accepted the case to answer the question:

In a 5 to 4 decision, the split Court ruled that Wyoming's admission did not abrogate the Indians' rights.
The majority opinion was authored by Sotomayor, joined by Ginsburg, Breyer, Kagan, and Gorsuch. The dissenters were Roberts, Thomas, Alito, and Kavanaugh.

References

External links
 Who gets to hunt Wyoming's elk? Tribal Hunting Rights, U.S. Law and the Bannock 'War' of 1895
 

2019 in United States case law
United States Supreme Court cases
United States Supreme Court cases of the Roberts Court
United States Supreme Court criminal cases
Crow tribe
Bighorn National Forest
United States Native American treaty case law
Native American history of Wyoming
United States Native American case law